Giovanni Niccolò delle Caselle Migliorati (died in 16 October 1410) was an Italian Cardinal. From 12 June 1405; he was Archbishop of Ravenna from 1400 to 1405. From 1405 he was Administrator of the same Archdiocese.

Notes

External links
 Profile at Catholic-hierarchy

1410 deaths
15th-century Italian cardinals
Archbishops of Ravenna
15th-century Italian Roman Catholic archbishops
Cardinal-nephews
Year of birth unknown